The Cal Poly Mustangs men's basketball team represents California Polytechnic State University, located in San Luis Obispo, California. The school's team currently competes in the Big West Conference. The Cal Poly men's basketball team's first season was 1907 and its first season as a four-year institution was 1941–42. The Mustangs are coached by John Smith and play their home games at Robert A. Mott Athletics Center.

The team began playing at the Division I level in 1994–95, and shortly thereafter won a regular-season conference title in the four-team American West Conference (since disbanded) with a 5-1 record in 1996. The 1995-96 championship season saw Cal Poly's Ben Larson average 3.45 steals per game, the third-most in NCAA history, while winning the AWC Player of the Year award. The Mustangs then joined the Big West ahead of the 1996-97 school year.

In 2009, ESPN selected Ernie Wheeler (1972-86) as the top coach in school history, along with Derek Stockalper as the best player in program history (joined by Jim Schultz, Mike Wozniak, Mike LaRoche and Varnie Dennis as the network's then-all time starting five).

Cal Poly advanced to its first Division I NCAA Tournament in 2014 after an historic run in the Big West Conference tournament, becoming the first 7th seed to win the championship, as the Mustangs defeated CSUN, 61-59, following a go-ahead 3-pointer made by Ridge Shipley at the Honda Center. Cal Poly earned the 16th seed and defeated Texas Southern in the NCAA first round in Dayton. Cal Poly then advanced to the 2nd Round, where they were defeated by unbeaten top seed Wichita State 64–37.

Prior to the 2014 conference tournament championship-game victory, Cal Poly advanced to the Big West Championship Game on two other occasions: in 2003 (falling to Utah State) and 2007 (to Long Beach State).

The Blue-Green rivalry 

The main rival of the Cal Poly Mustangs men's basketball team is the UC Santa Barbara Gauchos men's basketball team.  The rivalry is a part of the larger Blue–Green Rivalry, which encompasses all sports from the two schools.

Postseason

NCAA Division I Tournament results
The Mustangs have appeared in one NCAA tournament. Their record is 1–1.

NCAA Division II Tournament results
The Mustangs have appeared in the NCAA Division II tournament seven times. Their combined record is 7–8.

CIT results
The Mustangs have appeared in one CollegeInsider.com Postseason Tournament (CIT). Their record is 0–1.

Season-by-season results

NBA players 
 In 2017, David Nwaba became the first Cal Poly alum to play in the NBA, making his debut for the Los Angeles Lakers, his hometown team. Nwaba, who made the 2016-17 G-League All-Defensive Team, has also played for the Chicago Bulls, Cleveland Cavaliers, Brooklyn Nets and Houston Rockets. While with Cal Poly, Nwaba was selected to the 2014 Big West All-Tournament Team, and was voted as the conference's Player of the Week on December 22, 2014.

Other notable pro alumni 
 Sean Chambers, Philippines Aces
 Chris Eversley, Westports Malaysia Dragons
 Mike LaRoche, Los Angeles Stars
 Derek Stockalper, Lugano Tigers
 Drake U'u, Perth Wildcats

References